Kirklinton Middle is a civil parish in the Carlisle district of Cumbria, England.  It contains 14 listed buildings that are recorded in the National Heritage List for England.  Of these, one is listed at Grade II*, the middle of the three grades, and the others are at Grade II, the lowest grade.  The parish is almost entirely rural, and the listed buildings consist of farms and farm buildings, houses and associated structures, a former Friends' meeting house and burial wall, a church and associated structures, a former water mill, and four milestones.


Key

Buildings

References

Citations

Sources

Lists of listed buildings in Cumbria